On 10 May 2021, during the 2021 Israel–Palestine crisis, a rocket fired by Hamas towards Israel misfired and fell inside the Gaza Strip city of Jabalia, killing seven people.

Hamas authorities said that they had launched the rocket around 6 PM from the Sheikh Radwan neighborhood of Gaza City.

According to Human Rights Watch the rocket had accidentally hit a shop on Martyr Salah Dardona Street near the Al-Omari mosque. Seven people were killed, including a four-year-old and a teenager. 15 people were reportedly injured, including five children.

Human Rights Watch said that witnesses had told them the rockets appeared to be unguided BM-21 Grads. HRW described the use of such missiles as a war crime.

Reference

2021 in the Gaza Strip
May 2021 events in Asia
2021 disasters in Asia
Disasters in the Palestinian territories
Friendly fire incidents
Hamas